This is a list of films which placed number-one at the weekend box office in China during 2021.

References

2020
China